Neptune is the second studio album by the London-based band The Duke Spirit. It was the last with the original lead guitarist, Dan Higgins. The album was released on 4 February 2008 on the independent label You Are Here.

The song "Lassoo" is used in the game Guitar Hero On Tour: Modern Hits for North America and the UK, and "Send a Little Love Token" is on the main set list for Guitar Hero 5 and Forza Motorsport 3.

Critical reception
The Independent praised Liela Moss, writing that she possesses "not just a powerful set of pipes but also the spirit to duke it out (so to speak) with a rock band playing full-tilt at full volume." Spin wrote that "these Brits move with purpose from girl-group-inspired pop ('My Sunken Treasure') to fully loaded Jesus and Mary Chain–fried fuzz ('Lassoo') in remarkably short steps." The Times wrote that "well-crafted pop songs with an art-rock bent are the mainstay."

Track listing

References

2008 albums
The Duke Spirit albums
Albums produced by Chris Goss